is a female Japanese rugby sevens player. She was part of Japan's sevens team that won silver at the 2014 Asian Games. She played at the 2016 Summer Olympics as a member of the Japan women's national rugby sevens team.

Yokoo was part of the Sakura sevens team that played in a curtain raiser match against Australia ahead of the 2015 Rugby Championship match between the Wallabies and the All Blacks in Sydney.

References

External links 
 
 

1992 births
Living people
People from Tokyo
Sportspeople from Tokyo
Olympic rugby sevens players of Japan
Japanese rugby sevens players
Japan international women's rugby sevens players
Rugby sevens players at the 2016 Summer Olympics
Waseda University alumni
Asian Games silver medalists for Japan
Medalists at the 2014 Asian Games
Asian Games medalists in rugby union
Rugby union players at the 2014 Asian Games